Galactose-1-phosphate uridylyltransferase (or GALT, G1PUT) is an enzyme responsible for converting ingested galactose to glucose.

Galactose-1-phosphate uridylyltransferase (GALT) catalyzes the second step of the Leloir pathway of galactose metabolism, namely:
UDP-glucose + galactose 1-phosphate  glucose 1-phosphate + UDP-galactose
The expression of GALT is controlled by the actions of the FOXO3 gene. The absence of this enzyme results in classic galactosemia in humans and can be fatal in the newborn period if lactose is not removed from the diet. The pathophysiology of galactosemia has not been clearly defined.

Mechanism
GALT catalyzes the second reaction of the Leloir pathway of galactose metabolism through ping pong bi-bi kinetics with a double displacement mechanism.  This means that the net reaction consists of two reactants and two products (see the reaction above) and it proceeds by the following mechanism: the enzyme reacts with one substrate to generate one product and a modified enzyme, which goes on to react with the second substrate to make the second product while regenerating the original enzyme.  In the case of GALT, the His166 residue acts as a potent nucleophile to facilitate transfer of a nucleotide between UDP-hexoses and hexose-1-phosphates.

UDP-glucose + E-His  Glucose-1-phosphate + E-His-UMP
Galactose-1-phosphate + E-His-UMP  UDP-galactose + E-His

Structural studies
The three-dimensional structure at 180 pm resolution (x-ray crystallography) of GALT was determined by Wedekind, Frey, and Rayment, and their structural analysis found key amino acids essential for GALT function. Among these are Leu4, Phe75, Asn77, Asp78, Phe79, and Val108, which are consistent with residues that have been implicated both in point mutation experiments as well as in clinical screening that play a role in human galactosemia.

Clinical significance
Deficiency of GALT causes classic galactosemia.  Galactosemia is an autosomal recessive inherited disorder detectable in newborns and childhood.  It occurs at approximately 1 in every 40,000-60,000 live-born infants.  Classical galactosemia (G/G) is caused by a deficiency in GALT activity, whereas the more common clinical manifestations, Duarte (D/D) and the Duarte/Classical variant (D/G) are caused by the attenuation of GALT activity.  Symptoms include ovarian failure, developmental coordination disorder (difficulty speaking correctly and consistently), and neurologic deficits. A single mutation in any of several base pairs can lead to deficiency in GALT activity. For example, a single mutation from A to G in exon 6 of the GALT gene changes Glu188 to an arginine and a mutation from A to G in exon 10 converts Asn314 to an aspartic acid.  These two mutations also add new restriction enzyme cut sites, which enable detection by and large-scale population screening with PCR (polymerase chain reaction). Screening has mostly eliminated neonatal death by G/G galactosemia, but the disease, due to GALT’s role in the biochemical metabolism of ingested galactose (which is toxic when accumulated) to the energetically useful glucose, can certainly be fatal. However, those afflicted with galactosemia can live relatively normal lives by avoiding milk products and anything else containing galactose (because it cannot be metabolized), but there is still the potential for problems in neurological development or other complications, even in those who avoid galactose.

Disease database
Galactosemia (GALT) Mutation Database

References

Further reading

External links 
 
  GeneReviews/NIH/NCBI/UW entry on Galactosemia  
 Galactosemia (GALT) Mutation Database
 GALT Protein Database
 PDBe-KB provides an overview of all the structure information available in the PDB for Human Galactose-1-phosphate uridylyltransferase

EC 2.7.7